Ezra Laderman (29 June 1924 – 28 February 2015) was an American composer of classical music. He was born in Brooklyn.

Biography
Laderman was of Jewish heritage. His parents, Isidor and Leah, both emigrated to the United States from Poland. Though poor, the family had a piano. He wrote, "At four, I was improvising at the piano; at seven, I began to compose music, writing it down. I hardly knew it then, but I had at a very early age made a giant step to becoming a composer." He attended New York City's High School of Music and Art.

On April 25, 1943, Laderman was inducted into the United States Army and served as a radio operator with the 69th Infantry Division during World War II. He wrote: We were in Caversham, England poised to enter the war. It was here that I learned that my brother Jack had been shot down and killed in Germany. The Battle of the Bulge, crossing the Rhine at Remagen, liberating Leipzig, meeting the Russians at Torgau on the bank of the Elbe were the points in this constellation that was filled with tension and waiting, victory and grief. We became aware of the horror, and what we now call the 'holocaust,' while freeing Leipzig. 
During the weeks after the war was over, Laderman composed his Leipzig Symphony. This work brought him recognition within the army, and subsequently he was assigned as orchestrator of the GI Symphony Orchestra.

Laderman was discharged from the army on April 22, 1946. He studied composition under Stefan Wolpe of New York City and Miriam Gideon of Brooklyn College where he earned his B.A. in 1950. He then went on to study under Otto Luening of Columbia University where he earned his M.A. in 1952. Laderman's compositions range from solo instrumental and vocal works to large-scale choral and orchestral music. He has also written music to the Academy Award-winning films The Eleanor Roosevelt Story  and Black Fox.

Laderman has been commissioned three times by the Philadelphia Orchestra, twice by the National, Louisville and Chicago Symphonies as well as from the New York Philharmonic, Detroit, Pittsburgh, Los Angeles Philharmonic, Dallas, Houston, Fort Worth, Syracuse, Denver, Columbus, Albany, and New Haven Symphony Orchestras. In 1971 he collaborated with Alfredo Antonini – Musical Director of the CBS Symphony Orchestra during the television premier of his opera And David Wept.. In addition he has written for such distinguished artists as Jean-Pierre Rampal, Yo-Yo Ma, Emanuel Ax, Sherrill Milnes, Aldo Parisot, Samuel Baron, David Shifrin, Ransom Wilson, Judith Raskin, Elmar Oliveira, Erica Morini, Nathaniel Rosen, Stephen Kates, Toby Appel, and Leonard Arner, among many others.

From 1971 to 1982 he was Professor of Music Composition at the State University of New York, Binghamton and Senior Composer in Residence.   In 1979 he became the director of the Music Program at the National Endowment for the Arts
In 1991 he was elected into the membership of the American Academy of Arts and Letters and, in 2006, he was elected president for a three-year term ending in 2009. In 2004 he was awarded an honorary MusD from the State University of New York, Binghamton.  Through June 2014 Laderman taught music composition at Yale University's School of Music . A resident of Teaneck, New Jersey, Laderman was named as Dean at the Yale School of Music in 1989 and served in that position to 1995. He died on 28 February 2015 at the age of 90.

Laderman's notable students have included Sarah Kirkland Snider.

Awards
 1956 Guggenheim Fellowships
 1964 Rome Prize American Academy in Rome
 1983 Rome Prize American Academy in Rome
1987 The Barlow Endowment for Music Composition award at BYU.edu  commission for Orchestra with Emanuel Ax (piano) titled Second Piano Concerto. Barlow 1987 commission award recipients

References

External links
 A partial list of his published works is available here. 
Ezra Laderman's page at Theodore Presser Company
Compilations of his works are listed at Albany Records
Yale School of Music
Obituary by the Marine Biological Laboratory in Woods Hole, MA.

Bruce Duffie's interview with Ezra Laderman, September 7, 1988 
Magic Prison performed by the Binghamton Philharmonic, February 22, 1976

1924 births
2015 deaths
21st-century classical composers
20th-century classical composers
American male classical composers
American classical composers
United States Army personnel of World War II
American people of Polish descent
Jewish American classical composers
Brooklyn College alumni
Columbia University alumni
The High School of Music & Art alumni
Musicians from Brooklyn
People from Teaneck, New Jersey
United States Army soldiers
Yale School of Music faculty
Pupils of Stefan Wolpe
Pupils of Otto Luening
21st-century American composers
20th-century American composers
Classical musicians from New York (state)
20th-century American male musicians
21st-century American male musicians
Presidents of the American Academy of Arts and Letters
21st-century American Jews